Sydney Augustus Paget (19 April 1857 – 16 September 1916) was an English aristocrat who owned and raced Thoroughbred racehorses in the United States and who managed the racing operations for prominent owners, William C. Whitney and James Ben Ali Haggin.

Background
Sydney Paget was the fifth son and twelfth child of Cecilia Wyndham and her husband, Lord Alfred Paget.

Army
Sydney Paget served with the British Army in the Second Boer War, achieving the rank of Lieutenant with the machine gun section of the XIIth Yeomanry.

Horse racing and management
Paget's brother, Almeric, married Pauline Payne Whitney, daughter of the enormously wealthy William C. Whitney who hired Sydney Paget to manage his New York Thoroughbred racing stable. Paget ran a ranch at Big Horn, Wyoming for William Whitney where he raised Thoroughbreds on the open range.

Among the other top horses Paget was involved with was the filly Hamburg Belle who won the prestigious Belmont Futurity Stakes in 1903. Hamburg Belle was owned by James Ben Ali Haggin but raced in Paget's name.

Paget racing stable
Near the end of the 1890s, Paget left the employ of W.C. Whitney to go on his own. In July 1898 he bought Kentucky Derby winner Plaudit from John E. Madden for $25,000. The horse continued to race successfully that year but broke down while training in early 1899 and was retired from racing. Paget sold Plaudit back to Madden for $12,000 who sent him to stand at stud at his Hamburg Place breeding farm near Lexington, Kentucky.

In the pre-U.S. Triple Crown era, Paget owned the American Champion Two-Year-Old Colt of 1898, Jean Bereaud. The colt went on to win the 1899 Belmont Stakes. Paget also won the 1905 Preakness Stakes with Cairngorm.

Paget died in London on 16 September 1916 at age 59.

References

 Aiken Polo Club information on Sir Sydney Paget
 17 August 1902 New York Times article with information on Sydney Paget
 23 March 1906 article on Sydney Paget's marriage with background

1857 births
1916 deaths
British racehorse owners and breeders
American racehorse owners and breeders
Owners of Preakness Stakes winners
People from Long Melford
Sydney
British Army personnel of the Second Boer War
British Yeomanry officers